We Sold Our Souls for Rock 'n Roll is a 2001 documentary by Penelope Spheeris. It was filmed at the 1999 Ozzfest and won an award for "Most Popular Documentary" at the 2001 Melbourne International Film Festival. Legal issues delayed the release. The documentary received mixed reviews.

Cast
Black Sabbath
Buckethead
Deftones
Fear Factory
Godsmack
Ozzy Osbourne
Primus
Rob Zombie
Slayer
Slipknot
Static-X
System of A Down

References

External links
 

2001 films
American documentary films
Films directed by Penelope Spheeris
Documentary films about heavy metal music and musicians
2000s English-language films
2000s American films